Khashuri Municipality is a municipality of Georgia, in the region of  Shida Kartli. Khashuri municipality is located at 690 meters above sea level. It is bordered on the east and north by Kareli Municipality, on the north by Sachkhere Municipality, on the south and west by Borjomi Municipality, and on the west by Kharagauli Municipality. Area of Khashuri municipality is 585.2 km2. The total length of the boundaries of the municipality is 118 kilometers. Distance from the capital to Khashuri is 120 km, and from the regional center is 47 km. Khashuri Municipality also has a favorable strategic location, as it is located at the crossroads of Eastern, Western and Southern Georgia.

The municipality has a moderately humid subtropical climate. Knows moderately cold winters and warm summers. The main rivers are the Mtkvari and Suramula, which cross the municipality. Vegetation is varied from steppe to subalpine.

The industrial enterprises of the municipality are mainly concentrated in the city of Khashuri. The main fields of agriculture are: farming, viticulture, cattle breeding. The business sector in Khashuri Municipality is mainly represented by construction organizations, industrial organizations and large farming organizations. There are 32 state and 2 non-state general education schools in the municipality, there are libraries, a puppet theater and 3 museums.

Population
The representative body of Khashuri Municipality is the Sakrebulo of the municipality, and the executive body is the Board. There are one urban (Khashuri), one Sadabo (Surami) and 11 rural administrative units (Ali, Gomi, Osiauri, Flevi, Kvishkheti, Tsotskhnara, Tskhramukha, Tsaghvli, Tsromi, Khalebi, Khtsisi) in the municipality, which include 84 more villages. The population is up to 65 thousand, most of them live in cities and towns.

The administrative center of the municipality is the city of Khashuri since 1921. The city-type settlement in Khashuri was founded in the 1960s, which was facilitated by the construction of a railway in Georgia. The main railway line Poti-Tbilisi passed through the territory of Khashuri. The main railway workshops were opened here, which were one of the largest enterprises in the Transcaucasia. From this period Khashuri is an important junction of the railway.

The majority of the population is Georgian, there are also Armenians, Jews, Russians, Ossetians, Greeks and Ukrainians.

Settlements

Historic monuments

Historical and architectural monuments located in the territory of Khashuri district are: 
Tsromi church
Surami Fortress
St. George Temple of Surami 
Kviratskhoveli Church 
Tsaghvli and Tsromi villages and others.

Politics

Khashuri Municipal Assembly (Georgian: ხაშურის საკრებულო) is a representative body in Khashuri Municipality. currently consisting of 27 members. The council is assembles into session regularly, to consider subject matters such as code changes, utilities, taxes, city budget, oversight of city government and more. Khashuri sakrebulo is elected every four year. The last election was held in October 2021.

See also 
 List of municipalities in Georgia (country)

References

External links 
 Districts of Georgia, Statoids.com
 Official Website

Municipalities of Shida Kartli